This is a list of the most prominent historians of  Canada. All have published about Canada, but some have covered other topics as well.

A-G

Irving Abella, Jewish and labour
 John M. Beattie, crime 
David Bercuson, labour, military, politics
Pierre Berton, numerous popular histories
Carol Bishop-Gwyn, dance
Conrad Black, biographer of Duplessis; history of Canada
Michael Bliss, medical
Robert Bothwell, 20th century
Gerard Bouchard, Quebec
Mark Bourrie, maritime, media
George Williams Brown, editor and textbooks
Nick Brune, textbooks
J. M. S. Careless, politics
Pierre Francois Xavier de Charlevoix, New France
 Sarah Carter, Prairie History, Gender History
Margaret Conrad, women, maritimes
G. Ramsay Cook, politics, biography
Terry Copp, World War II
Tim Cook military historian 
Hugh Cowan, Ontario
Donald Creighton, 19c, textbooks
Ernest Alexander Cruikshank, military and Ontario, Chairman of the Historic Sites and Monuments Board
  Louise Dechêne, New France
Lovat Dickson, 20th century
Gordon Donaldson, politics
Olive Dickason, First Nations
William J. Eccles, New France
John English, politics
Francois Xavier Garneau, Quebec
Placide Gaudet, Acadian
Andrew Godefroy, military
W. G. Godfrey, Maritimes
George R. D. Goulet, Métis
Terry Goulet, Métis
J.L. Granatstein, 20th century, military; politics; historiography
Charlotte Gray, popular histories
James H. Gray, Prairies; politics
Cody Groat, First Nations
Lionel Groulx, Quebec

H-N

Kenn Harper, Inughuit 
Craig Heron, labour and social history, public history
Bruce Hodgins, historian and author
Bruce Hutchison, local history, popular history
Harold Innis, economic history; communications
Benjamin Isitt, 20th century; New left
A.J.B. Johnston
Gregory Kealey, labour
Fred Landon, Ontario, Upper Canada
Laurier LaPierre
Agnes Laut
Arthur R. M. Lower
Keith Matthews
Margaret MacMillan, diplomacy
Ian McKay
Peter Thomas McGuigan, Nova Scotia
Phyllis McKie Maritime history
Margaret Stovel McWilliams, Manitoba
Jesse Edgar Middleton, Ontario, Toronto
Christopher Moore, popular
Adrien-Gabriel Morice, First Nations
Desmond Morton, military
W. L. Morton, West; Manitoba
Hilda Neatby, Quebec
Peter C. Newman, 20th century politics
Gustave Lanctot, New France

O-Z

Margaret Ormsby
Fernand Ouellet
Douglas Owram
Erna Paris
 Joy Parr, gender, children
Talbot Mercer Papineau
 Francis Parkman, American historian of New France
Lester B. Pearson
Derek Penslar
Bob Plamondon
Andrew Preston
Robie Lewis Reid
Stanley Bréhaut Ryerson
Roger Sarty
J.T. Saywell
 Adam Shortt
Joseph Schull
Paul St. Pierre
Jean Edward Smith
C.P. Stacey
George F.G. Stanley
Veronica Strong-Boag
Alastair Sweeny
Brian Douglas Tennyson
Bruce Trigger
Marcel Trudel
Pierre Elliot Trudeau
 Frank Underhill
Mark Sweeten Wade
Frederick William Wallace
Patrick Watson
 John C. Weaver, urban
Frederick George H. Williams
George Woodcock
J. F. C. Wright
George MacKinnon Wrong
Robert J. Young

By category
To display all subcategories below click on the ►

See also 

Historiography of Canada
 History of Canada
 List of historians
 List of Canadian writers
 The Canadian Centenary Series

Further reading

 Artibise, Alan F. J., ed.  Interdisciplinary Approaches to Canadian Society: A Guide to the Literature. (1990). 156 pp.
 Berger, Carl. Writing Canadian History: Aspects of English Canadian Historical Writing since 1900, 2nd edition (1986)
 Berger, Carl, ed. Contemporary Approaches to Canadian Writing (1987)
 Bliss, Michael. "Privatizing the Mind: The Sundering of Canadian History, the Sundering of Canada," Journal of Canadian Studies 26 (Winter 1991–92): 5-17
 Brandt, Gail Cuthbert. "National Unity and the Politics of Political History," Journal of the Canadian Historical Association 3 (1992): 3-11
 Dick, Lyle. "A Growing Necessity for Canada: W. L. Morton's Centenary Series and the Forms of National History, 1955-80," The Canadian Historical Review 82, No. 2 (June 2001), 223–252.
  Edwards, Justin D.l  and Douglas Ivison. Downtown Canada: Writing Canadian Cities (2005) excerpt and text search
 Gagnon, Serge. Quebec and its Historians: 1840 to 1920 (English ed. 1982; French ed. 1978)
 Gagnon, Serge. Quebec and its Historians: The Twentieth Century (English ed. 1985)
 Glassford, Larry A. "The Evolution of 'New Political History' in English-Canadian Historiography: From Cliometrics to Cliodiversity." American Review of Canadian Studies. 32#3 (2002). pp 347+. online edition
 Granatstein, J. L.  Who Killed Canadian History? (2000)
 Granatstein, J. L. A Reader's Guide to Canadian History: Confederation to the Present (1982)
 Hallowell, Gerald, ed. The Oxford Companion to Canadian History (2006), online at OUP
 Kealey, Gregory S. "Class in English-Canadian Historical Writing: Neither Privatizing, Nor Sundering," Journal of Canadian Studies 27 (Summer 1992):
  Kealey, Linda, Ruth Pierson, Joan Sangster, and Veronica Strong-Boag. "Teaching Canadian History in the 1990s: Whose 'National' History Are We Lamenting?," Journal of Canadian Studies 27 (Summer 1992):
 Muise, D. A. ed., A Reader's Guide to Canadian History: i, Beginnings to Confederation (1982); historiography
 Granatstein, Jack, ed.  A Reader's Guide to Canadian History: Confederation to the Present v2 (1982); historiography
 Osborne, Ken. "'Our History Syllabus Has Us Gasping': History in Canadian Schools--Past, Present, and Future," The Canadian Historical Review 81 (September 2000):
 Parr, Joy. "Gender History and Historical Practice," The Canadian Historical Review 76 (September 1995): 354-376
 Story, Norah. Oxford Companion to Canadian History and Literature (1974)
 Taylor, M. Brook,  ed. Canadian History: A Reader's Guide. Vol. 1. Doug Owram, ed. Canadian History: A Reader's Guide. Vol. 2. Toronto: 1994. historiography
 Rudin, Ronald. Making History in Twentieth Century Quebec (1997)
 Schultz, John. ed. Writing About Canada: A Handbook for Modern Canadian History (1990),
 Strong-Boag, Veronica, Mona Gleason, and Adele Perry. Rethinking Canada: The Promise of Women's History (2003) excerpt and text search
 Strong-Boag, Veronica. "Contested Space: The Politics of Canadian Memory," Journal of the Canadian Historical Association 5 (1994): 3-16
 Warkentin, John, ed. So Vast and Various: Interpreting Canada’s Regions in the Nineteenth and Twentieth Centuries (2010); looks at 150 years of writings about Canada's regions.
 Wright, Donald. The Professionalization of History in English Canada (2005) 280pp  excerpt and text search

External links
Famous Historians from Canada - Ranker
Browse "Historians" - The Canadian Encyclopedia
Canadian Historical Association

 
Historians